Iain Smith (born 1 May 1960) is a Scottish Liberal Democrat politician. He was the Member of the Scottish Parliament (MSP) for the North East Fife constituency from 1999 until his defeat at 2011 election by the SNP's Rod Campbell.

Education
Smith was educated at Bell Baxter High School in Cupar, Fife before reading Politics and Economics at Newcastle University.

Early career
Prior to entering Holyrood, Smith worked for Northumberland County Council, managed an Advice Centre in Dundee and was Constituency Assistant to North East Fife MP, Sir Menzies Campbell. Simultaneously, he was a Councillor and Leader of the Liberal Democrats on Fife Council 1986–99.

In Parliament
Smith was elected to the first Scottish Parliament in May 1999 to represent his home constituency of North East Fife and was appointed as Deputy Minister for Parliamentary Business in the government of First Minister Donald Dewar. A post he held until Dewar's death the following year.

He convened the Parliament's Procedures Committee from 2003–05 when he was elected Convener of the Education Committee, a position he held until the 2007 Scottish Parliament election.

After the election Smith was appointed Scottish Liberal Democrat Spokesperson for Europe, External Affairs and Culture and was elected by his colleagues to Chair of the Scottish Liberal Democrat Parliamentary Party. In September 2008 he became Convener of the Scottish Parliament's influential Economy, Energy and Tourism Committee.

Between 2001–2011 he represented the Scottish Parliament as a member of the British-Irish Parliamentary Assembly.

Personal life
Smith was one of four openly gay, lesbian or bisexual MSPs in the 2007–2011 Parliament, along with Scottish Green Party leader Patrick Harvie, former MSP Margaret Smith and Joe FitzPatrick.

For the past eight years, Smith has lived with his partner in Ladybank. He has a broad interest in sports; particularly cricket and football. He likes to travel widely and has a keen interest in culture.

References

External links 
 
Iain Smith profile at the site of Scottish Liberal Democrats

1960 births
Living people
Gay politicians
Liberal Democrat MSPs
Alumni of Newcastle University
Members of the Scottish Parliament 1999–2003
Members of the Scottish Parliament 2003–2007
Members of the Scottish Parliament 2007–2011
People from Fife
People educated at Bell Baxter High School
LGBT members of the Scottish Parliament